Yguazú (also known as Colonia Yguazú) is a city and district of Paraguay's Alto Paraná Department, founded by Japanese immigrants.

Weather
The average temperature is 21°C, the maximum 38°C and minimum 0°C. Most of Paraguay's rain is in this region.

Geography
Located on the River Iguazu, in the heart of the region of Alto Paraná. 
87000 of 10000 hectares were under water in the reservoir River Iguazu, which, as well as in Rio Monday kina different fish abound.

Demographics 
6493 men, 5784 women out of 12277 persons. (Censuses and surveys)

History 
Founded on August 22, 1961 in compliance with an agreement Migration between Japan and Paraguay, was first administered by the International Cooperation Agency of Japan, JIC.

Among the population can be found in Paraguay, Brazilian, Japanese, German, Switzerland and France, which maintain their own language and religion and traditions.

Economy
It is also known as the Capital of Plantío direct or tillage because it is one of the first areas that implemented this new system of Conservation of Soil Properties.

Most people who are growing Japanese soy, soybeans, wheat and wheat and macadamia nuts. They are grouped in the Cooperative Iguaçu progressive.

The main economic activities are agriculture and livestock increasing.

It is one of the most prosperous colonies of Alto Paraná.

Tourism 
Go Routes II "Mariscal José Félix Estigarribia" and VII "Dr. Jose Gaspar Rodriguez de Francia", 40 km from Ciudad del Este.

Enjoy fishing on both Monday of the Rio Iguazu or River.

Since the dam can see the Great Lake and the forest reserves of ANDE.

On May 1. There is an offer by San Jose Obrero, try different types of food and music festivals of Paraguay and Japan.

You can visit the annual presentation of "Friendship Square." District Marshal Francisco Solano Lopez is close to the colony.

References and Bibliography 
 Illustrated Geography of Paraguay, SRL Distributed Arami, 2007. 
 Geography of Paraguay, First Edition 1999, Publisher Hispanic Paraguay SRL

External links 
  National Secretary of Tourism

Yguazú District
Populated places established in 1961